Jiří Novák was the last champion in 1998. He chose to compete at London during the same week, losing in the first round.

Juan Ignacio Chela won the title by defeating Mariano Puerta 6–4, 7–6(7–4) in the final.

Seeds

Draw

Finals

Top half

Bottom half

References

External links
 Official results archive (ATP)
 Official results archive (ITF)

Mexican Open (tennis)
Singles